Edgemoor is an unincorporated community in northeastern Chester County, South Carolina, United States. Edgemoor has one post office with a zip code of 29712.

References

Unincorporated communities in Chester County, South Carolina
Unincorporated communities in South Carolina